Teohari Georgescu (January 31, 1908 – December 31, 1976) was a Romanian statesman and a high-ranking member of the Romanian Communist Party.

Early life
Born in Chitila, near Bucharest, he was the third of seven children of Constantin and Aneta Georgescu. Georgescu, whose formal education ended after the fourth grade, began his career as an assistant in his father's store. In 1923, he was sent to the main printing house in Bucharest, Cartea Românească, to apprentice as a typesetter. Three years later, his father now dead, he joined the Gutenberg printers' union and secretly began to read Communist leaflets. He soon joined the Communist party, then illegal.

Underground activity
Georgescu became a member of the party's Central Committee and its secretariat, participating in secret meetings, organising strikes, and spreading leaflets. Siguranța Statului, the Kingdom of Romania's secret services, began to keep an eye on him, and he was first arrested in 1933 for authoring leaflets that were spread in the typesetters' room at Cartea Românească. A young and capable lawyer, Iosif Schraer, ensured that Georgescu was released after only two months in prison and a few beatings.

Further arrests followed; finally, after being detained in April 1941, the next month he was sentenced to ten years' imprisonment at Caransebeș. Gheorghe Gheorghiu-Dej named him leader of the prison's communist group before being transferred to Târgu Jiu prison in 1943.

Career peak (1944-52)

He was released after the arrival of the Red Army in August 1944, and at Ana Pauker's suggestion he became undersecretary of state at the Ministry of Interior on November 4. He was well-qualified for the clandestine work the job required: in 1940, in Moscow, Georgescu had received training, coordinated by Georgi Dimitrov, from NKVD agents; he learned both the secret code for corresponding with the Comintern, and a special technique for writing its messages on glass. In Bucharest he communicated, either directly or through Gheorghe Pintilie, with General Dmitri Fedichkin, a Soviet adviser who gave him orders to infiltrate and Sovietize the security services: Siguranța Statului (the secret police), the Gendarmerie, and Serviciul Special de Informații (lit. "Special Intelligence Service").

As a reward for accomplishing this mission, Georgescu was promoted to Minister of Interior once Petru Groza's government took power on March 6, 1945. He also served on the Politburo, was the Secretary of the Party's Central Committee, and ran the United Workers' Front, which coordinated the actions of communists and social democrats. As Minister of Interior he contributed to the country's denazification and later to the reorganization of the law enforcement system along the Soviet model, supervising the establishment of several penal colonies and coordinating a dekulakization campaign. Georgescu was also instrumental in setting up the administrative divisions of the Romanian People's Republic on the Soviet model. Along with Gheorghiu-Dej, Pauker, and Vasile Luca, he was considered one of leaders directing the new regime's policy, as highlighted by the popular epigram "Ana, Luca, Teo, Dej / Bagă spaima în burgheji" (Ana, Luca, Teo[hari], Dej / Put the fear into the bourgeois").

Fall from grace 1952
In January 1952, General Secretary Gheorghiu-Dej travelled to Moscow to seek Joseph Stalin's approval for purging the leadership of the Romanian Communist Party, accusing Pauker, Luca, and Georgescu of fomenting factional intrigue; Vyacheslav Molotov intervened on behalf of Pauker, whereas Lavrentiy Beria defended Georgescu. Together with Pauker and Luca, Georgescu was purged at the plenum of May 26–27, 1952, simultaneously accused of left-wing and right-wing deviationism. He was also accused of a conciliatory stance regarding Luca's deviation and, ironically, of insufficient militancy against the class enemy and revolutionary vigilance. He was thus dismissed from his ministerial post on May 28, losing all his other party and state posts as well: vice-premier, member of the secretariat, politburo and orgburo. Unlike the other two, he had not spent World War II in Moscow, but the Comintern's suggestion in 1940 that Georgescu be made General Secretary kept Gheorghiu-Dej wary of his influence. Furthermore, as Luca and Pauker began to fall from grace in early 1952 (their fate having been decided in Moscow), he made the mistake of standing by them. Initially "assigned to work at a lower level", he was arrested on February 18, 1953, and investigated by his former subordinates at the Securitate for three years. At one point, his wife and two children (one of them an infant) were arrested in order to induce him to give evidence against Lucrețiu Pătrășcanu. He confessed guilt to all charges, but was nevertheless released in April 1956.

Georgescu returned to his old workplace, Cartea Românească, now called "Întreprinderea 13 Decembrie", first working as a proofreader and then being appointed manager before retiring in 1963.

Rehabilition under Ceaușescu (1968–1974)
After Nicolae Ceaușescu came to power in 1965, he was rehabilitated at the April 1968 plenary. He was appointed candidate member of the Central Committee at the party's 1972 national conference, holding the post until 1974. He died in obscurity; after cremation, his ashes were placed in the Monument of the Heroes for the Freedom of the People and of the Motherland, for Socialism in Bucharest's Carol Park, being removed after the Romanian Revolution of 1989.

Notes

References

External links
 Final Report of the Presidential Commission for the Study of the Communist Dictatorship in Romania, pp. 652–3

Romanian communists
Romanian Ministers of Interior
Deputy Prime Ministers of Romania
Members of the Chamber of Deputies (Romania)
Romanian typographers and type designers
People from Ilfov County
1908 births
1976 deaths
Prisoners and detainees of Romania
Romanian prisoners and detainees